The Kansas City Cowboys were a National Football League team based in Kansas City, Missouri. The team was founded as the Kansas City Blues in 1924, and as the Kansas City Cowboys in 1925 and 1926. The Blues competed as a traveling team, playing all of their NFL games in other cities' stadiums in their only year under that name. LeRoy Andrews acted as the team's player-coach.

History
The team was owned by Maurice R. Smith, Joe Brecklein and Cameron K. Reid. The Cowboys were known for dressing in cowboy attire and fans came out in great numbers to see them play. Immediately after the game, the Giants hired away head coach LeRoy Andrews and most of the Cowboys players. Maurice R. Smith then arranged to give what remained of the team to Cleveland under the condition that it would be given back if he wanted the team returned.

President Joe Carr (of the NFL) agreed to the arrangement although there was never any assurance it would be honored. The Kansas City Cowboys were actually purchased by the Cleveland Bulldogs in 1927 and merged with that franchise. It is believed The Bulldogs were sold to the Detroit Wolverines who hired coach LeRoy Andrews to coach the team. The Wolverines were then bought by the New York Giants who deactivated the team bringing the story of the Kansas City Cowboys, Cleveland Bulldogs and Detroit Wolverines to an end.

Coach Steve Owen played for the Kansas City Cowboys and played for the Cleveland Bulldogs. He and LeRoy Andrews fell out over their part of the purchase price for the Cowboys when they were sold to the Bulldogs and resulted in his contract being sold to the New York Giants. Owen was then hired as head coach of the Giants in 1931 and remained their coach until 1953.

Pro Football Hall of Famers

Season-by-season

References

See also
Sports in Kansas City
Kansas City Chiefs
American Football League (1934) – sole championship was won by St. Louis/Kansas City Blues

American football teams established in 1924
American football teams disestablished in 1926
Defunct National Football League teams
Sports in the Kansas City metropolitan area
American football teams in Kansas City, Missouri
1924 establishments in Missouri
1926 disestablishments in Missouri